In basketball, a rebound is the act of gaining possession of the ball after a missed field goal or free throw. An offensive rebound occurs when a player recovers the ball after their own or a teammate's missed shot attempt, while a defensive rebound occurs when a player recovers the ball after an opponent's missed shot attempt. The National Basketball Association's (NBA) rebounding title is awarded to the player with the highest rebounds per game average in a given season. It was first recognized in the 1950–51 season, which was the second season after the league was created in 1949 by merger of the 3-year-old BAA and 12-year-old NBL. Players who earned rebounding titles before the 1973–74 season did not record any offensive or defensive rebounds because statistics on them were not recorded before that season. To qualify for the rebounding title, a player must appear in at least 58 games (out of 82). However, a player who appears in fewer than 58 games may qualify as annual rebounding leader if his rebound total would have given him the greatest average, had he appeared in 58 games. This has been the requirement since the 2013–14 season.  The rebounding title was originally determined by rebound total through the 1968–69 season, after which rebounds per game was used to determine the leader instead.

Wilt Chamberlain holds the all-time records for total rebounds (2,149) and rebounds per game (27.2) in a season; both records were achieved in the 1960–61 season. He also holds the rookie records for total rebounds, with 1,941 in the 1959–60 season. Among active players, Andre Drummond has the highest season rebound total (1,247) and the highest season rebounding average (15.99), both achieved in the 2017–18 season.  At 22 years, 130 days, Dwight Howard is the youngest rebounding leader in NBA history (achieved in the  season), while Dennis Rodman is the oldest at 36 years, 341 days (achieved in the  season).

Chamberlain has won the most rebounding titles in his career, with 11. Dennis Rodman has won a record seven consecutive rebounding titles.  Moses Malone has won six rebounding titles. Howard has won five rebounding titles. Kevin Garnett and Bill Russell have won four rebounding titles each. Drummond has won four rebounding titles. Elvin Hayes, Dikembe Mutombo, Hakeem Olajuwon, Ben Wallace, and DeAndre Jordan are the only other players who have won the title multiple times. Six players have won the rebounding title and the NBA championship in the same season: Mikan in 1953 with the Minneapolis Lakers; Russell in 1959, 1964, and 1965 with the Boston Celtics; Chamberlain in 1967 and 1972 with the Philadelphia 76ers and the Los Angeles Lakers, respectively; Bill Walton in 1977 with the Portland Trail Blazers; Malone in 1983 with the 76ers; and Rodman in 1996, 1997, and 1998 with the Chicago Bulls.

Key

Annual leaders

Multiple-time leaders

Notes

References
General

Specific

National Basketball Association lists
National Basketball Association statistical leaders